Fort Jefferson was a town on the Mississippi River, about one mile south of Wickliffe, Kentucky in southwestern Ballard County.  

In 1779, George Rogers Clark built a stronghold of the same name at the intersection of the Mississippi and Ohio Rivers in order to consolidate his forces and to control access to the Ohio.
The original fort was burned down by Chickasaw forces in 1781. The settlement was reestablished in 1858.  The town itself no longer exists. The site is now home of the Phoenix Paper mill.

Planning of Fort Jefferson
The initial proposal for a fortification on the mouth of the Ohio was made by Virginia governor Patrick Henry in 1777, in a letter to the Spanish governor of Louisiana, Bernardo de Galvez. He proposed a fortification to protect trade and supplies between Virginia and Spanish Louisiana from British interference. Henry would also propose this idea to George Rogers Clark, who saw it as a fortification for frontier protection and conquest of British Indian allies. Clark would later press Henry's successor, Thomas Jefferson, on the importance of a fort along both rivers, to control commerce and stop British supplies. In January of 1780, Jefferson formally approved the fort with the formal stipulation that the land must be purchased from the Chickasaws, whom he erroneously identified as Cherokees. Jefferson would also write to Joseph Martin that "the ground at the mouth of the Ohio on the south side belonging to the Cherokee, we would not meddle in without their leave". George Rogers Clark would go on to ignore this provision, as he would not buy the land from the Chickasaws or gain their consent to build the fortifications. Many historians point to Clark's disregard of the Chickasaw as the point at which the fortification and settlement project was doomed to failure.

Aftermath
In 1782, four Chickasaw chiefs sent a letter to American military post commanders in the west to open peace negotiations, stating "What damage was done by reason you settled a fort in our hunting ground without our leave and at that place you suffered most from us". The Chickasaw would eventually sign a peace treaty with the Spanish (representing the American alliance) that respected Chickasaw territorial integrity, but kept them at war with the Kickapoo.

References

Jefferson